Jordan Oram is a Canadian cinematographer who best known for his work on Drake's music videos "God's Plan", "In My Feelings" and "Life Is Good" and also feature films Spiral and When Morning Comes. In 2021, Oram released a plantable book titled The Journeyman.

Career
Oram started shooting music videos and short films with Ron Dias  and Kelly Fyffe-Marshall as early as 2011. Oram said that he manifested  working on the biggest music video for Drake and ironically his breakthrough was when he worked on Drake's music video "God's Plan" which was directed by Karena Evans. The music video caught the eye of director Darren Lynn Bousman from the Saw franchise and hired him for the Saw spin off Spiral. Oram was the director of photography on CBC's The Porter which was later acquired by BET. Oram won the Prism Prize  Special Achievement Award in 2021.

Filmography

Music videos

Feature film

Television

References

External links 
 
 

Canadian cinematographers
Year of birth missing (living people)
Living people
Black Canadian artists